Diogo de Oliveira Yabe (born August 8, 1980, in Londrina, Paraná, Brazil), is a Brazilian competitive swimmer who specializes in medley events.

Married with Fabíola Molina.

He swam at the 2002 Pan Pacific Swimming Championships, where he finished 12th in the 200-metre individual medley.

In May 2003, Yabe achieved fame for breaking the Ricardo Prado's South American record in the 200-metre individual medley, a record that stood since 1983.

At the 2003 World Aquatics Championships, Yabe was in the 200-metre individual medley, but was disqualified.

Yabe was at the 2003 Pan American Games in Santo Domingo, where he ranked 6th place in the 200-metre individual medley and in the 400-metre individual medley.

Participated in the 2004 Summer Olympics in the 200-metre individual medley, where he earned a 26th-place finish.

At the 2006 South American Games in Buenos Aires, Yabe won a gold medal in the 400-metre individual medley, two silver medals in the 200-metre individual medley and 4×100-metre freestyle, and a bronze medal in the 4×200-metre freestyle.

At the 2007 Pan American Games in Rio de Janeiro, ranked 4th in the 400-metre individual medley, and 8th in the 200-metre individual medley 

He was at the 2010 Pan Pacific Swimming Championships in Irvine, where he finished 14th in the 200-metre individual medley, and 15th in the 400-metre individual medley.

He was at the 2010 FINA World Swimming Championships (25 m), where he finished 25th place in the 200-metre individual medley, and in 17th place in the 400-metre individual medley.

As one of the representatives of Brazil in the 2011 Pan American Games in Guadalajara, won the silver medal in the 4×200-metre freestyle by participate at heats.

At the 2011 Military World Games, held in Rio de Janeiro, Diogo won the gold medal in the 200-metre individual medley  and in the 400-metre individual medley.

References

1980 births
Living people
Sportspeople from Londrina
Brazilian male freestyle swimmers
Brazilian male medley swimmers
Swimmers at the 2003 Pan American Games
Swimmers at the 2007 Pan American Games
Swimmers at the 2011 Pan American Games
Swimmers at the 2004 Summer Olympics
Pan American Games medalists in swimming
Pan American Games silver medalists for Brazil
South American Games gold medalists for Brazil
South American Games silver medalists for Brazil
South American Games bronze medalists for Brazil
South American Games medalists in swimming
Competitors at the 2006 South American Games
Olympic swimmers of Brazil
Medalists at the 2011 Pan American Games
20th-century Brazilian people
21st-century Brazilian people